Leutnant Hartmuth Baldamus (first name sometimes rendered Hartmut) (10 August 1891 – 14 April 1917) was a German World War I flying ace credited with 18 aerial victories.

Early life
Hartmuth Baldamus was born in Dresden on 10 August 1891.

World War I service
Baldamus was in German aviation from the start of the First World War. Ranked as a Gefreiter, he flew a two-seater reconnaissance airplane for Feldflieger Abteilung 20 (Field Flier Detachment 20) beginning 29 March 1915. On 20 September 1915, he was commissioned a Leutnant. By the end of 1915, Baldamus had been awarded the Albert Order, Knight Second Class.

He scored his first aerial victory on 15 March 1916; he scored his fifth confirmed victory on 29 July 1916, though details of some of his earlier wins are missing. Having performed the rather unusual feat of becoming an ace before being assigned to a fighter squadron, Baldamus was now posted to fly fighters with Jagdstaffel 5 (Fighter Squadron 5) on 27 August 1916. He moved on to Jagdstaffel 9 (Fighter Squadron 9) in early November 1916. On 2 December he closed out 1916 with nine victories.

The requirement for winning the Pour le Merite had been set at eight victories for the very earliest German aces, the so-called Fokker Scourge. Now, as Baldamus seemed to qualify, the requirement was raised out of his reach. However, he did receive the prestigious Knight's Cross with Swords of the Royal Hohenzollern House Order on 8 January 1917.

Baldamus resumed scoring on 23 January 1917, and steadily achieved more single victories, reaching 17 on 12 April 1917. Two days later, at 1140 hours, Hartmut Baldamus slammed into a midair collision with the French Nieuport 17 serial 2539 of Escadrille N37 piloted by Caporal Simon. Baldamus crashed to his death near Sainte-Marie-à-Py. Simon counted as Baldamus' 18th victory.

Footnote

Sources of information

References
 Above the Lines: The Aces and Fighter Units of the German Air Service, Naval Air Service and Flanders Marine Corps, 1914–1918. Norman Franks, Frank W. Bailey, Russell Guest. Grub Street, 1993. , .

External links 
 Obituary in Der Champagne-Kamerad

1891 births
1917 deaths
Aviators killed by being shot down
German military personnel killed in World War I
Military personnel from Dresden
Luftstreitkräfte personnel
People from the Kingdom of Saxony